In Greek mythology, Biston  (Ancient Greek: Βίστων or Βιστών) was the son of Ares and Callirrhoe, daughter of river-god Nestus. His two brothers were Odomas and Edonus (eponyms of two Thracian tribes, the Odomanti and the Edoni). Alternately, he was called son of Paeon and grandson of Ares. In some accounts, he was the son of either the Muses Terpsichorus or Calliope.

Mythology 
Biston built the city of Bistonia on the shores of Lake Bistonis in Thrace. He also introduced the Thracian practice of tattooing both men and women with eye-like patterns as a magical fetish, in response to an oracle which guaranteed victory against the neighbouring Edonians tribe if so adorned.  The Thracian Bistonians were famous for their warlike nature and cult of Ares whom they worshipped in the form of an upright standing sword.

See also
 Bistones
 Bistonis, the nymph who lives at Lake Bistonis.

Notes

Reference 

 Stephanus of Byzantium, Stephani Byzantii Ethnicorum quae supersunt, edited by August Meineike (1790-1870), published 1849. A few entries from this important ancient handbook of place names have been translated by Brady Kiesling. Online version at the Topos Text Project.

Kings in Greek mythology
Children of Ares
Greek mythology of Thrace